Bring Me Victory is an EP by the doom metal band My Dying Bride. "Bring Me Victory" is a song from My Dying Bride's previous album, For Lies I Sire; a video was made for the song and released on this EP. "Scarborough Fair", an English traditional song, has two additional verses incorporated into it written by Aaron Stainthorpe. "Failure" is a cover of a song written by Swans. The original version had long been a highly respected song among the members of the band. "Vast Choirs" is a live version of a song originally released on My Dying Bride's first album, As The Flower Withers, and since included on several compilation releases.

This is the first release to feature Shaun Macgowan on keyboards and violins (on tracks 2 and 3), since he replaced Katie Stone's position in the band.

Track listing
 "Bring Me Victory" – 4:11
 "Scarborough Fair" – 6:20
 "Failure" (Swans cover) – 6:47
 "Vast Choirs" (Live at Graspop Metal Meeting 2008) – 10:54

Personnel 
Aaron Stainthorpe – vocals
Andrew Craighan – guitars
Hamish Glencross – guitars
Lena Abé – bass
Katie Stone – keyboards, violins (on tracks 1 & 4)
Shaun MacGowan – keyboards, violins (on tracks 2 & 3)
Dan Mullins – drums

References

2009 EPs
My Dying Bride EPs